The Escape Tour was a concert tour by the American rock band Journey in support of their seventh studio album, Escape.

Background
The tour included six consecutive sold out dates at the Pine Knob Theatre in Detroit, and four straight sold out shows at the Los Angeles Forum, and Chicago's Rosemont Horizon. Journey also made an appearance on July 2, 1982 at the Rose Bowl in Pasadena, California with Blue Öyster Cult, Triumph and Aldo Nova. The -month tour took Journey through Japan and North America. 

Point Blank, Billy Squier, the Greg Kihn Band and Loverboy were the opening acts during the tour.

Reception
Deborah Deasy, a reporter from the Pittsburgh Press, who attended the sold out October 2, 1981 performance, gave criticism toward the band on their deliverance of fast and furious noise, even noting that there was too little 'danceable rock 'n' roll'. The reporter noted on Perry's vocals being grating and overworked, but praised the other members of Journey individually. Deborah cited on the uninspired songwriting and the chemistry, criticizing the band as 'generic rock'. She concluded her review, praising the stage work done by the technical, set and sound designers as well as the surprise fireworks, but also noted on the opening act Point Blank had, criticizing the lackluster lead singer who she claimed was "too impressed with himself".. A warmer reception was had by press in the band's hometown of San Francisco, where Chronicle writer Joel Selvin gushed effusively about the band's video monitors, sound and pyrotechnics, adding that Journey delivered a "masterful triple stroke" that "set a new standard in the rock concert arms race" that makes "all that came before" it, "as old fashioned as a Model T."

Setlist

Songs played overall
 "Escape"
 "Line of Fire"
 "Lights"
 "Keep on Runnin'"
 "When the Love Has Gone"
 "Sandcastles"
 "Still They Ride"
 "Where Were You"
 "Stay Awhile"
 "Do You Recall"
 "Open Arms"
 "Mother, Father"
 "Don't Stop Believin'"
 "Walks Like a Lady"
 "Stone in Love"
 "Who's Crying Now"
 "Separate Ways (Worlds Apart)"
 "Where Were You" and drum solo
 "Keep on Runnin'"
 "The Party's Over (Hopelessly in Love)"
 "Dead or Alive"
 "Little Girl"
 "Too Late"
 "Moon Theme"
 "Wheel in the Sky"
 "Winds of March"
 "Lovin' You is Easy"
 "Too Far Gone" (The Babys cover)
 "La Do Da"
 "Too Late"
 "Lay it Down"
 "Turn Around in Tokyo" (The Babys cover)
Encore
 "Lovin', Touchin', Squeezin'"
 "Any Way You Want It"
Encore 2
 "Dixie Highway"

Typical setlist
 "Escape"
 "Line of Fire"
 "Lights"
 "Where Were You"
 "Stay Awhile"
 "Open Arms"
 "Mother, Father"
 "Don't Stop Believin'"
 "Lovin' You Is Easy"
 "Stone in Love"
 "Who's Crying Now"
 "Keep on Runnin'"
 "The Party's Over (Hopelessly in Love)"
 "Dead or Alive"
 "Too Late"
 "Wheel in the Sky"
Encore
 "Lovin', Touchin', Squeezin'"
 "Any Way You Want It"

Tour dates

Over the course of the tour, Journey played the following dates:

Personnel
Steve Perry – lead vocals, keyboards, piano
Neal Schon – lead guitar, backing vocals
Ross Valory – bass, backing vocals
Jonathan Cain – keyboards, piano, rhythm guitar, backing vocals
Steve Smith – drums, percussion

References

1981 concert tours
1982 concert tours
Journey (band) concert tours